The Dahiya doctrine, or Dahya doctrine, is a military strategy of asymmetric warfare, outlined by former Israel Defense Forces (IDF) Chief of General Staff Gadi Eizenkot, which encompasses the destruction of the civilian infrastructure of regimes deemed to be hostile as a measure calculated to deny combatants the use of that infrastructure and endorses the employment of "disproportionate power" to secure that end.

The doctrine is named after the Dahieh neighborhood of Beirut, where Hezbollah was headquartered during the 2006 Lebanon War, which were heavily damaged by the IDF.

History

2006 Lebanon War
The first public announcement of the doctrine was made by general Gadi Eizenkot, commander of the IDF's northern front, in October 2008. He said that what happened in the Dahya (also transliterated as Dahiyeh and Dahieh) quarter of Beirut in 2006 would, "happen in every village from which shots were fired in the direction of Israel. We will wield disproportionate power against [them] and cause immense damage and destruction. From our perspective, these are military bases. [...] This isn't a suggestion. It's a plan that has already been authorized. [...] Harming the population is the only means of restraining Nasrallah."

According to analyst Gabi Siboni at the Israeli Institute for National Security Studies: "With an outbreak of hostilities [with Hezbollah], the IDF will need to act immediately, decisively, and with force that is disproportionate to the enemy's actions and the threat it poses. Such a response aims at inflicting damage and meting out punishment to an extent that will demand long and expensive reconstruction processes. Israel's test will be the intensity and quality of its response to incidents on the Lebanese border or terrorist attacks involving Hezbollah in the north or Hamas in the south. In such cases, Israel again will not be able to limit its response to actions whose severity is seemingly proportionate to an isolated incident. Rather, it will have to respond disproportionately in order to make it abundantly clear that the State of Israel will accept no attempt to disrupt the calm currently prevailing along its borders. Israel must be prepared for deterioration and escalation, as well as for a full-scale confrontation. Such preparedness is obligatory in order to prevent long term attrition."

Noting that Dahya was the Shia quarter in Beirut that was razed by the Israeli Air Force during the 2006 Lebanon War, Israeli journalist Yaron London wrote in 2008 that the doctrine, "will become entrenched in our security discourse."

Naftali Bennett told Haaretz in a March 2017 interview: "The Lebanese institutions, its infrastructure, airport, power stations, traffic junctions, Lebanese Army bases – they should all be legitimate targets if a war breaks out. That's what we should already be saying to them and the world now. If Hezbollah fires missiles at the Israeli home front, this will mean sending Lebanon back to the Middle Ages". He claimed that this strategy would speed up international intervention and shorten the campaign.

Gaza War
Some analysts have argued that Israel implemented such a strategy during the 2008–09 Gaza War, with the Goldstone Report concluding that the Israeli strategy was "designed to punish, humiliate and terrorize a civilian population".

A leaked U.S. embassy cable from October 2008, two months prior to the Gaza War, reports that General Gadi Eizenkot in his first interview in four years, discussed Israel's northern, central, and southern regions, and "labeled any Israeli response to resumed conflict the "Dahya doctrine" in reference to the leveled Dahya quarter in Beirut during the 2006 Lebanon War. He said Israel will use disproportionate force upon any village that fires upon Israel." The 2009 United Nations Fact Finding Mission on the Gaza Conflict makes several references to the Dahya doctrine, calling it a concept which requires the application of "widespread destruction as a means of deterrence" and which involves "the application of disproportionate force and the causing of great damage and destruction to civilian property and infrastructure, and suffering to civilian populations." It concluded that the doctrine had been put into practice during the conflict. However, in a 1 April 2011 op-ed, one of the lead authors of the report, Judge Richard Goldstone, stated that some of his conclusions may have been different had the Israeli government cooperated with his team during the investigation. The op-ed has been interpreted by some as a retraction of the report and its conclusions. Goldstone's three co-authors were strongly critical of his statement.

The doctrine is defined in a 2009 report by the Public Committee Against Torture in Israel as follows: "The military approach expressed in the Dahiye Doctrine deals with asymmetrical combat against an enemy that is not a regular army and is embedded within civilian population; its objective is to avoid a protracted guerilla war. According to this approach Israel has to employ tremendous force disproportionate to the magnitude of the enemy’s actions." The report further argues that the doctrine was fully implemented during Operation Cast Lead.

Criticism
Richard Falk wrote that under the doctrine, "the civilian infrastructure of adversaries such as Hamas or Hezbollah are treated as permissible military targets, which is not only an overt violation of the most elementary norms of the law of war and of universal morality, but an avowal of a doctrine of violence that needs to be called by its proper name: state terrorism."

See also
 Battle of Algiers
 Counter-insurgency
 Counter-terrorism
 Fourth-generation warfare
 Hannibal Directive
 International law and the Arab–Israeli conflict
 State terrorism

References

External links
 Satellite Identification of Damage in Beirut, Lebanon – satellite photographs of Dahya district before and after the war
 Disproportionate Force: Israel's Concept of Response in Light of the Second Lebanon War – INSS Insight No. 74, 2 October 2008 - Siboni, Gabi
 The Third Lebanon War: Target Lebanon – INSS Strategic Assessment, November 2008, Volume 11, No. 2 - Eiland, Giora

Israel Defense Forces
Targeting (warfare)
2008 introductions
Civilians in war
Military doctrines